Christmas orchid is a name for various orchids, flowering around the time of Christmas or otherwise popular as a Christmas decoration:

 Angraecum sesquipedale (Star of Bethlehem orchid)
 Cattleya percivaliana (Percival's cattleya)
 Winika cunninghamii (Winika)
 Cattleya trianae (May flower)